The Independent Evaluation Office is an autonomous body established in 2001 to conduct independent evaluations of policies and activities of the International Monetary Fund.

See also
 The World Bank Group's Independent Evaluation Group

External links
IEO Home

International Monetary Fund
Ombudsman organizations